Dollar for Dollar is a 1920 American silent drama film produced, directed by, and starring stage star Frank Keenan. It was written by Ethel Watts Mumford and distributed through Pathé Exchange.

It was filmed at various locations in the United States including Big Bear Lake, Big Bear Valley, and San Bernardino National Forest.

Cast
Frank Keenan as Marcus Gard
Kathleen Kirkham as Mrs. Marteen
Katharine Van Buren as Dorothy Marteen
Harry von Meter as Victor Mordant (credited as Harry van Meter)
Jay Belasco as Teddy Mordant
Gertrude Claire as Mrs. Mordant
Larry Steers as Lewis Denning
Harry Kendall as Thomas Brencherly

Preservation status
A copy of Dollar for Dollar is preserved at the EYE Institut Filmmuseum, Netherlands.

References

External links

Film still at worthpoint.com (archived)

1920 films
American silent feature films
American black-and-white films
Pathé Exchange films
Silent American drama films
1920 drama films
1920s American films
Films directed by Frank Keenan